Ølstykke is a former municipality in Region Hovedstaden. The former Ølstykke municipality covered an area of 29 km2, and had a total population of 15,358 (2005).  Its last mayor was Svend Kjærgaard, a member of the Venstre (Liberal Party) political party.

On 1 January 2007, Ølstykke municipality ceased to exist as the result of Kommunalreformen ("The Municipality Reform" of 2007).  It was merged with Ledøje-Smørum and Stenløse municipalities to form the new Egedal municipality.  This created a municipality with an area of 126 km2 and a total population of 39,267 (2005).

See also 
 Ølstykke station
 Ølstykke FC

References  
 Municipal statistics: NetBorger Kommunefakta, delivered from KMD aka Kommunedata (Municipal Data)
 Municipal mergers and neighbors: Eniro new municipalities map

External links 
 The new Egedal municipality's official website (Danish only)

Former municipalities of Denmark